The Andersia Tower is a mixed-use building in the Stare Miasto area of Poznań, Poland. Completed in 2007, it stands at 102.1 m (335 ft) tall. It is the tallest building in Poznań.

Gallery

References

External links

Buildings and structures completed in 2007
Skyscrapers in Poland